Patrick Gerigk (born April 16, 1972 in Berlin) is a football wide receiver from Germany. He played for several World Bowl-winning teams, such as the Rhein Fire (1998) and the Frankfurt Galaxy (1999). 

He stands 183 cm tall and weighs 90 kg.

External links
 Profile

1972 births
Living people
Sportspeople from Berlin
German players of American football
American football wide receivers
Rhein Fire players
Frankfurt Galaxy players